This article provides a collection of statewide public opinion polls that were conducted relating to the 2004 United States presidential election. All candidates involved in polling are John Kerry, against incumbent President George W. Bush, with third-party candidates Ralph Nader (Independent), Michael Badnarik (Libertarian), David Cobb (Green), and Michael Peroutka (Constitution). Additional third-party candidates were on the Minnesota presidential ballot.

Opinion polling

Alabama
9 electoral votes(Republican in 1996)(Republican in 2000)

Three-way race

Alaska
3 electoral votes(Republican in 1996)(Republican in 2000)

Three-way race

Arizona
10 electoral votes(Democrat in 1996)(Republican in 2000)

Three-way race

Arkansas
6 electoral votes(Democrat in 1996)(Republican in 2000)

Three-way race

California
55 electoral votes(Democrat in 1996)(Democrat in 2000)

Three-way race

Colorado
9 electoral votes(Republican in 1996)(Republican in 2000)

Three-way race

Six-way race

Connecticut
7 electoral votes(Democrat in 1996)(Democrat in 2000)

Three-way race

Delaware
3 electoral votes(Democrat in 1996)(Democrat in 2000)

District of Columbia
3 electoral votes(Democrat in 1996)(Democrat in 2000)

Florida
27 electoral votes(Democrat in 1996)(Republican in 2000)

Three-way race

Five-way race

Georgia
15 electoral votes(Republican in 1996)(Republican in 2000)

Three-way race

Hawaii
4 electoral votes(Democrat in 1996)(Democrat in 2000)

Three-way race

Idaho
4 electoral votes(Republican in 1996)(Republican in 2000)

Illinois
21 electoral votes(Democrat in 1996)(Democrat in 2000)

Three-way race

Indiana
11 electoral votes(Republican in 1996)(Republican in 2000)

Three-way race

Iowa
7 electoral votes(Democrat in 1996)(Democrat in 2000)

Three-way race

Four-way race

Kansas
6 electoral votes(Republican in 1996)(Republican in 2000)

Three-way race

Kentucky
8 electoral votes(Democrat in 1996)(Republican in 2000)

Three-way race

Louisiana
9 electoral votes(Democrat in 1996)(Republican in 2000)

Three-way race

Six-way race

Maine
4 electoral votes(Democrat in 1996)(Democrat in 2000)

Three-way race

1st congressional district

2nd congressional district

Maryland
10 electoral votes(Democrat in 1996)(Democrat in 2000)

Three-way race

Massachusetts
12 electoral votes(Democrat in 1996)(Democrat in 2000)

Three-way race

Michigan
17 electoral votes(Democrat in 1996)(Democrat in 2000)

Three-way race

Minnesota
10 electoral votes(Democrat in 1996)(Democrat in 2000)

Three-way race

Four-way race

Eight-way race

Mississippi
6 electoral votes(Republican in 1996)(Republican in 2000)

Three-way race

Missouri
11 electoral votes(Democrat in 1996)(Republican in 2000)

Three-way race

Montana
3 electoral votes(Republican in 1996)(Republican in 2000)

Three-way race

Six-way race

Nebraska
5 electoral votes(Republican in 1996)(Republican in 2000)

Three-way race

1st congressional district

2nd congressional district

3rd congressional district

Nevada
5 electoral votes(Democrat in 1996)(Republican in 2000)

Three-way race

Four-way race

New Hampshire
5 electoral votes(Democrat in 1996)(Republican in 2000)

Three-way race

New Jersey
15 electoral votes(Democrat in 1996)(Democrat in 2000)

Three-way race

New Mexico
5 electoral votes(Democrat in 1996)(Democrat in 2000)

Three-way race

Four-way race

Five-way race

New York
31 electoral votes(Democrat in 1996)(Democrat in 2000)

Three-way race

North Carolina
15 electoral votes(Republican in 1996)(Republican in 2000)

Three-way race

North Dakota
3 electoral votes(Republican in 1996)(Republican in 2000)

Ohio
20 electoral votes(Democrat in 1996)(Republican in 2000)

Three-way race

Five-way race

Oklahoma
7 electoral votes(Republican in 1996)(Republican in 2000)

Three-way race

Oregon
7 electoral votes(Democrat in 1996)(Democrat in 2000)

Three-way race

Pennsylvania
21 electoral votes(Democrat in 1996)(Democrat in 2000)

Three-way race

Rhode Island
4 electoral votes(Democrat in 1996)(Democrat in 2000)

Three-way race

South Carolina
8 electoral votes(Republican in 1996)(Republican in 2000)

Three-way race

South Dakota
3 electoral votes(Republican in 1996)(Republican in 2000)

Three-way race

Tennessee
11 electoral votes(Democrat in 1996)(Republican in 2000)

Three-way race

Texas
34 electoral votes(Republican in 1996)(Republican in 2000)

Three-way race

Utah
5 electoral votes(Republican in 1996)(Republican in 2000)

Three-way race

Vermont
3 electoral votes(Democrat in 1996)(Democrat in 2000)

Virginia
13 electoral votes(Republican in 1996)(Republican in 2000)

Three-way race

Washington
11 electoral votes(Democrat in 1996)(Democrat in 2000)

Three-way race

West Virginia
5 electoral votes(Democrat in 1996)(Republican in 2000)

Three-way race

Four-way race

Wisconsin
10 electoral votes(Democrat in 1996)(Democrat in 2000)

Three-way race

Four-way race

Wyoming
3 electoral votes(Republican in 1996)(Republican in 2000)

2004 United States presidential election by state